Isobella Jade (born September 3, 1982) is an American author, petite model and inspirational speaker and also works in public relations. She became known as one of the first people to do something notable inside an Apple store, typing her first draft of her manuscript Almost 5’4”, a modeling memoir, at the Apple Store on Prince Street in SoHo in New York City. Jade has been featured in The New York Times, The New York Post, The Los Angeles Times, The Sydney Morning Herald, Glamour, Allure, Mac Life, Mac World UK, Marie Claire UK and multiple other international fashion magazines and Apple culture magazines.

Early life 
Isobella Jade was born Heather Staub in Syracuse, New York. Jade was a competitive track runner while attending Liverpool High School in Liverpool, New York. Despite her petite frame she qualified for the Young Women's 400 Meter Dash at the Junior Olympics in 1999. She also qualified for the NYSPHSAA Boys & Girls Championship and ran in the Class A Girls 400 Meter Dash, with a time of 62.30 seconds. Although her best time in the 400 meter dash was 60.9 seconds. She also ran the 600 meter dash with a best time of 1:41.1 minutes.
Jade received a track scholarship at New York Institute of Technology. She started pursuing modeling during her sophomore year of college at New York Institute of Technology in Manhattan. After graduating from NYIT with her Bachelor of Science in Advertising, Jade decided to continue her modeling career.

Author
Jade published her first book Almost 5’4” in June 2007 through Amazon's self-publishing platform, Booksurge. The New York Post described how Jade wrote her manuscript for Almost 5’4” at the Apple store with, “People have long cataloged the bizarre writing habits of authors, from P.G. Wodehouse pinning pages on his wall to Dan Brown timing his push-up and sit-up breaks with an hourglass. Now we can add the name Isobella Jade to that collection.” 
The New York Times also recognized her for using the Apple Store as a unique writing space, “As for Ms. Jade, whose modeling career is advancing, she has yet to buy a computer from the Apple store. But she is still welcome to check her e-mail — and stay as long as she likes.” In addition Macworld magazine described the book as, “a very readable, very revealing memoir that feels at times like you are peeking at someone's secret diary. It's possibly the only book ever to have been written entirely on the free Mac computers at a New York Apple Store. Part memoir, part inspirational guide, Almost 5'4" would make a good film, and likely the rather persuasive Isobella Jade would insist on playing the lead.”  
The Friday Project, an imprint of HarperCollins in the United Kingdom published an edition of Almost 5’4” in February 2010. 
Marie Claire UK shared Jade's raw account of being a shorter than average model and Jade shared with the magazine, “I love that modeling is not as much about being perfect as it is about having character.” 
In November 2009 Soft Skull Press published Jade's graphic novel Model Life:  The Journey of Pint-Size Fashion Warrior.  Model Life, illustrated by Jazmin Ruotolo, is a fictional graphic novel based on Jade's own adventures as a shorter model in New York City. Model Life involves many Internet-age elements and most of the communication between characters happens through social media and text messaging.  The New York Daily News featured the book launch of Model Life  and covered the book release party in SoHo, which showcased a live photo shoot of five petite shoe models. 
Allure magazine said that Model Life, “takes a brand-new approach to the story of a girl trying to break into the biz.”   Jade is also the author of the Careful, Quiet, Invisible series, the first book of the series, Careful, launched July 26, 2012. While writing "Careful, Quiet, Invisible," Jade is working on a digital graphic novel series called Model Life.

Publishing Company
Jade launched her own publishing company Gamine Press on May 14, 2009.

In June 2009, Jade decided to republish Almost 5’4” under her own publishing company Gamine Press.

In 2010, inspired by her blog readers, Jade published Short Stuff: on the job with an x-small model, which also includes modeling tips for shorter models.

Jade is currently writing a young adult book series called Careful, Quiet, Invisible.

In the summer of 2012, the first book of the Careful, Quiet, Invisible series was released in print and as an eBook. Careful, is about the spirit of a teen girl who dies in a texting and driving crash and the book brings to the YA book world a serious present day social issue. 
.

Modeling
Isobella Jade has worked as a print model and body parts model. Her first modeling job was for Brown Shoe at the Fashion Footwear Association of New York shoe show. She has modeled shoes and been a foot model for Marshalls, Victoria's Secret, Bath and Body Works, Easy Spirit, Woman's World magazine, Seventeen magazine and Whole Living magazine among many others.  Her hands appeared in a Fall Fashion Macy's commercial and were hired numerous times for editorials in Bon Appétit magazine. She appeared as a body model on the Fashionably Late with Stacy London show on TLC and was featured as a parts model in Nylon magazine. She has modeled and been featured in editorials for LUNA magazine (Milan), Bon Magazine (Sweden) and GQ (Italy).

Social media
Along with pushing the boundaries of being a petite model, Isobella Jade also advocates ways that other aspiring models of all sizes can find opportunities in the modeling industry and how shorter girls can look more proportioned and longer in photos, through her blog, podcast and social media platform.

Blog
Jade has written about the day in the life of a shorter model and tips for how other girls can find opportunities in modeling no matter their height or where they live at the blog www.petitemodelingtips.com since June 2007, and she also shares fashion tips for petite sizes.

Podcast
Since September 27, 2007 Jade has hosted a top entertainment podcast on the Blogtalkradio network. Her show has received over one million downloads.  On the podcast she dishes out tips and advice for models of all sizes. Past industry professionals she's interviewed include, fitness expert Gunnar Peterson and Fashion and Sports Illustrated Swimsuit photographer Steve Erle, Jewelry designer Kendra Scott, celebrated Fashion designer Bradley Bayou, along with beauty brands such as Lush (company), Origins, Wet n Wild, Styli-Style and others. All her segments all have an inspirational angle; she often shares self-publishing tips as well and hosts book readings.

Public image and influence
Isobella Jade is known as one of the shortest working models in America. The Los Angeles Times has featured Jade, stating, “Before Tyra was giving shorties hope on Cycle 13 of 'America's Next Top Model,' Isobella Jade was already in their corner.”
Through her books and social media platforms, Jade has become a spokesperson for aspiring petite models of all ages. 
Media Bistro's Galleycat, has called Jade a self-promotion expert from the insight she has shared with their readers on the power of self-promotion in publishing and brand building. 
Jade has spoken on panels at BookExpo America and the Self-Publishing Book Expo, The New York Round Table Writers' Conference, the Writers' League of Texas Agents and Editors conference, SiriusXM Book Radio and others sharing her own story of being self-made while discussing the topics of marketing yourself as an author and being your own publicist on a budget.

Quotes
Isobella Jade often tells her blog readers that “height isn't everything” and to “aim high and strive on,” and that “the higher you aim the more you get” and to “give yourself a chance.”

References

1982 births
Living people
American women writers
Female models from New York (state)
Writers from Syracuse, New York
New York Institute of Technology alumni
21st-century American women